Cape Circoncision (Norwegian: Kapp Circoncision) is a peninsula on the north-western edge of subantarctic Bouvet Island.  The small peninsula was sighted by the French naval exploration that was led by Jean-Baptiste Charles Bouvet de Lozier on 1 January 1739, the Feast of the Circumcision day -- thus the name. The cape provided the location for the base-camp of the 1928-29 Norwegian expedition.

References

External links
CIA Factbook entry for Bouvet Island Includes a map showing the cape.

Headlands of Bouvet Island
Subantarctic peninsulas